Bhairabsthan  is a village development committee in the Palpa District of the Lumbini Zone in southern Nepal. According to the 1991 Nepal census, it had a population of 2937 people living in 544 individual households.

References

Populated places in Palpa District